Magdalena Maria Marcinkowska is a Polish jurist who serves as an permanent representative to UNESCO in Paris (since 2020).

Life 

In 2016, she defended at the University of Gdańsk her doctoral thesis on the impact of the international law on cultural policy on Poland in the field of cultural heritage protection (doctoral advisor – Kamil Zeidler). As a researcher she specializes in legal mechanisms in managing cultural heritage on international and national levels, and their mutual interaction and cross-fertilisation.

She worked for the National Institute of Cultural Heritage of Poland, and as an assistant of the Deputy Minister of Culture and National Heritage and as a deputy director of the Monuments Protection Department of the Ministry of Culture and National Heritage of Poland.

In September 2020, she was appointed the Permanent Representative of Poland to UNESCO in Paris.

Works

References 

20th-century births
Living people
Permanent Representatives of Poland to the United Nations
Polish legal scholars
University of Gdańsk alumni